Stanley Fields is an American biologist best known for developing the yeast two hybrid method for identifying protein–protein interactions. He is currently a professor of Genome Sciences at the University of Washington and Howard Hughes Medical Institute Investigator.

Education
Fields was educated at the University of Cambridge where he was awarded a Doctor of Philosophy in 1981 for research carried out in the Laboratory of Molecular Biology (LMB) with Greg Winter and George Brownlee.

Research
Along with Matt Kaeberlein and Brian Kennedy,  Fields has carried out genome-wide screens for aging genes in yeast.  Kaeberlein and co-workers have questioned the hypothesis that lifespan extension from caloric restriction is mediated by Sirtuins.  Instead Kaeberlein, Fields, and Kennedy have proposed that caloric restriction increases lifespan by decreasing the activity of the Target of Rapamycin (TOR) kinase.

Honors and awards
2003 Jacob Heskel Gabbay Award in Biotechnology and Medicine (jointly with Roger Brent)

References

1955 births
Members of the United States National Academy of Sciences
Living people
American molecular biologists
American geneticists
University of Washington faculty
Howard Hughes Medical Investigators